Moa Mua Maliepo (born 12 May 1996) is a New Zealand-born Romanian rugby union football player. He plays as a centre positions for professional SuperLiga club Timișoara Saracens.

Club career
Before joining Timișoara Saracens, Moa Mua Maliepo played for Parramatta Two Blues and most recently for CSM București, from where he transferred to Saracens following the dissolution of his former club.

International career
Maliepo also plays for Romania's national team, the Oaks, making his international debut during the Week 3 of 2020 Rugby Europe Championship in a test match against the Los Leones.

Honours
CSM București
 Romanian Cup: 2018, 2019

References

External links

1996 births
Living people
New Zealand rugby union players
Romanian rugby union players
Romania international rugby union players
Parramatta Two Blues players
CSM București (rugby union) players
SCM Rugby Timișoara players
Rugby union centres